Rufigallol or 1,2,3,5,6,7-hexahydroxy-9,10-anthraquinone is an organic compound with formula , which can be viewed as a derivative of anthraquinone through the replacement of six hydrogen atoms (H) by hydroxyl groups (OH).  

The compound is soluble in dioxane, from which it crystallizes as red needles that sublime without melting at 365 °C. It can be obtained by treating gallic acid with concentrated sulfuric acid and then with sodium hydroxide.

Rufigallol is particularly toxic to the malarial parasite Plasmodium falciparum and has a synergistic effect in combination with the antimalarial drug exifone, which has structural similarities to rufigallol.

Rufigallol forms a crimson-colored complex with beryllium, aluminum, thorium, zirconium and hafnium, and this reaction has been used for the spot and spectrophotometric determination of beryllium in low concentrations.

See also
Quinone
Hydroxyanthraquinone
Hexahydroxyanthraquinone
Octahydroxyanthraquinone

References

Pyrogallols
Hydroxyanthraquinones
3-Hydroxypropenals